is a passenger railway station in located in the city of Arida, Wakayama Prefecture, Japan, operated by West Japan Railway Company (JR West).

Lines

Station layout
The station consists of one side platform and one island platform connected to the station building by a footbridge. The station is staffed.

Platforms

Adjacent stations

|-
!colspan=5|West Japan Railway Company (JR West)

History
Minoshima Station opened on February 28, 1924. With the privatization of the Japan National Railways (JNR) on April 1, 1987, the station came under the aegis of the West Japan Railway Company.

Passenger statistics
In fiscal 2019, the station was used by an average of 1642 passengers daily (boarding passengers only).

Surrounding Area
 Arida City Hall
 Arida Civic Center
Arita City Library
Arida City Folk Museum
Arida Mikan Museum

See also
List of railway stations in Japan

References

External links

 Arida Station Official Site

Railway stations in Wakayama Prefecture
Railway stations in Japan opened in 1924
Arida, Wakayama